Sir Oscar Charles Morland GBE (23 March 1904 - 20 May 1980) was  a British diplomat. He was the British Ambassador in Japan and Indonesia.

Early life
Oscar Charles Morland was son of Harold John Morland (28 Jul 1869 - 09 Oct 1939).

He married Alice on 1932, daughter of Sir Francis Oswald Lindley, PC, GCMG (12 Jun 1872 - 17 Aug 1950). The union produced four sons.

He was educated at Leighton Park School and at King's College, Cambridge.

Career
 Joined HM Consular Service, 1927.
 Served in Japan, Manchuria, London. Under Sec., Cabinet Office,
 1950–1953; Ambassador to Indonesia,
 1953–1956; Asst Under-Sec., FO,
 1956–1959. Mem., Leeds Regional Hosp. Bd,
 1959–1963. Ambassador to Japan
 1965–1974 (Chm. Mental Health and Geriatrics Cttee, 1972–74)

See also
 List of Ambassadors from the United Kingdom to Indonesia
 List of Ambassadors from the United Kingdom to Japan
 Anglo-Japanese relations

Notes

References
 Hoare, James. (1999). Embassies in the East: the Story of the British Embassies in Japan, China, and Korea from 1859 to the Present.  Richmond, Surrey: Curzon Press. ;  OCLC 42645589
 Nish, Ian. (2004). British Envoys in Japan 1859-1972. Folkestone, Kent: Global Oriental. ;  OCLC 249167170

External links
 UK in Japan,  Chronology of Heads of Mission

1904 births
1980 deaths
Ambassadors of the United Kingdom to Japan
Ambassadors of the United Kingdom to Indonesia
20th-century British diplomats